The Groupement Européen de Banques is an organization of European private banks. It was founded in 1981. The current members are the Bank of Åland, Banca March, Banca Sella, Bank J.Van Breda & C°, Bankhaus Lampe, Banque Martin Maurel, and C. Hoare & Co.

References

Business organizations based in Europe
Banking organizations
Organizations established in 1981